Dutch Mountain may mean:
A summit:
 Dutch Mountain (Arizona) a summit in Apache County, Arizona 
 Dutch Mountain (Maine) a summit in Waldo County, Maine
 Dutch Mountain (Pennsylvania) a summit in Wyoming County, Pennsylvania
 Dutch Mountain (Kinney County, Texas) a summit in Kinney County, Texas
 Dutch Mountain (Llano County, Texas) a summit in Llano County, Texas
 Dutch Mountain (Utah) a summit in Tooele County, Utah